Stephen McCarthy (born 18 May 1962) is a former Australian rules footballer who played with Melbourne in the Victorian Football League (VFL).

Notes

External links 		
		
		
		
		
		
		
1962 births
Living people
Australian rules footballers from Victoria (Australia)		
Melbourne Football Club players
Ormond Amateur Football Club players